Pseudocrangonyctidae is a family of crustaceans belonging to the order Amphipoda.

Genera:
 Procrangonyx Schellenberg, 1934
 Pseudocrangonyx Akatsuka & Komai, 1922

References

Amphipoda